Rocío Igarzábal (born August 24, 1989 in San Isidro, Buenos Aires, Argentina), also known as Rochi Igarzábal, is an Argentine actress and singer.

Biography 
Rocío Igarzábal was born on August 24, 1989 in San Isidro, Buenos Aires, Argentina. Her parents are called Joaquín and Adriana, she has two sisters, Martina and Lucía. She is the second niece of the actress Soledad Silveyra.

Career 
In 2008 Rocío Igarzábal made her television debut when she was chosen for the role of Valeria "Vale" Gutiérrez in the television series Casi Ángeles. In 2011 she joined the pop group Teen Angels replacing María Eugenia Suárez. During 2012 and 2013 she played Brenda Bandi in the television series Dulce Amor issued by Telefe. In 2013 she debuted on the big screen with the documentary Teen Angels: El Adiós. In 2013 until the beginning of 2014 she starred alongside Gabriel Corrado the television series Taxxi, amores cruzados issued by Telefe. In 2015 she stars in cinema El desafío with Nicolás Riera and Gastón Soffritti, shot during 2014.

Personal life 
Rocío Igarzábal is a vegetarian and does yoga. From 2008 to 2011 Rocío Igarzábal was in a relationship with her co–star Pablo Martínez. From 2012 to 2014 Rocío Igarzábal was in a relationship with her co–star Nicolás Riera. Since 2015 Rocío Igarzábal is in a relationship with the musician Milton Cámara. On June 7, 2016, she gave birth to their first daughter and they called her Lupe Cámara.

Filmography

Television

Theater

Movies

Television Programs

Discography

Studio albums

Singles

References

External links 
 Website
 Fan club
 

1989 births
21st-century Argentine women singers
Argentine pop singers
Argentine stage actresses
Argentine telenovela actresses
Argentine television actresses
Living people
Actresses from Buenos Aires
People from San Isidro, Buenos Aires
Singers from Buenos Aires
Argentine people of Basque descent
Argentine expatriates in Mexico